Candida Royalle (born Candice Marion Vadala; October 15, 1950 – September 7, 2015) was an American producer and director of couples-oriented pornography, pornographic actress, sex educator, and sex-positive feminist. She was a member of the XRCO and the AVN Halls of Fame.

Early life and education
Royalle was born Candice Marion Vadala in New York City on October 15, 1950. Initially trained in music, dance and art in New York City, she studied at the High School of Art and Design, Parsons School of Design and the City University of New York.

Career

After graduating from Parsons School of Design, she began performing with the avant-garde theater group The Cockettes and in 1975 played Divine's daughter in the play The Heartbreak of Psoriasis.

In 1975, she began her career as a pornographic performer, appearing in about 25 movies before retiring in 1980 with Blue Magic, which she also wrote. Royalle quit as a performer because she got married, and was uncomfortable being sexual with other men. Moreover, she had increasingly felt that her strongly feminist views were at odds with the male-centric manner in which traditional pornography was produced and that she had been working in, giving virtually no attention to the female perspective, and making no effort to appeal to female viewers. The increasing availability of cable television and VCR around 1983 provided Royalle both with an incentive and opportunity to consider producing her own "feminist" pornography, aimed at women and couples who wanted to watch a different kind of porn from the privacy of their homes.

In early 1984, Royalle founded Femme Productions together with Lauren Neimi. Their goal was making erotica based on female desire, as well as pornographic films aimed at helping couple therapy. Her productions are aimed more at women and couples than at the standard pornographic audience of men, and have been praised by counselors and therapists for depicting healthy and realistic sexual activity.

Royalle stated that she tried to avoid "misogynous predictability", and depiction of sex in "…as grotesque and graphic [a way] as possible." She also criticized the male-centredness of the typical pornographic film, in which scenes end when the male actor ejaculates. Royalle's films are not "goal oriented" towards a final "cum shot"; instead, her films depict sexual activity within the broader context of women's emotional and social lives. In 1989, she signed the Post Porn Modernist Manifesto.

She was featured in Maya Gallus's 1997 documentary film Erotica: A Journey Into Female Sexuality.

Royalle wrote regular columns for adult magazines High Society and Cheri. She was also a public speaker, giving lectures at Smithsonian Institution, the World Congress on Sexology, and numerous universities and professional conferences.

In 2004, she authored the book How to Tell a Naked Man What to Do.

A five-track EP titled Candida Cosmica, a collaboration between Royalle and Patrick Cowley from the mid-1970s, was released in October 2016 by Dark Entries Records.

Affiliations
Royalle was a member of the American Association of Sex Educators, Counselors and Therapists, and a founding board member of Feminists for Free Expression.

Personal life and death
In the 1980s, Royalle was married to producer Per Sjöstedt; they separated in 1988. In May 2006, she announced that she was engaged to be married. She died in Mattituck, New York on September 7, 2015, aged 64, from ovarian cancer.

In media
In 2019, Candice, a documentary about Royalle's life and finding out what happened to her mother who left her as a child, was screened at various documentary film festivals. It was directed by Sheona McDonald and distributed by Mbur Indie Film Distribution.

Filmography 
During her acting career (1975–1980), Royalle performed in 25 traditional male-centred porn films, including Ball Game (1980) by Ann Perry, Hot & Saucy Pizza Girls, Hot Racquettes, Delicious, Fascination by Chuck Vincent, and finally Blue Magic (1980), which Royalle also wrote and her then-new husband Per Sjöstedt produced.

By 2013, Royalle had (jointly) written or directed 18 feminist porn films with Femme Productions since 1984, including:

 Femme (1984)
 Urban Heat (1984)
 Three Daughters (1986)
 Christine's Secret (1986)
 A Taste of Ambrosia (1987)
 Rites of Passion (1987)
 Sensual Escape (1988)
 Revelations (1993)
 My Surrender (1996)
 The Gift (1997)
 The Bridal Shower (1997)
 One Size Fits All (1998)
 Eyes of Desire (1998)
 Eyes of Desire 2 (1999)
 Afrodite Superstar (2006)
 Under the Covers (2007)

References

External links

 Candida Royalle's Website
 
 
 
 
 Papers of Candida Royalle, 1920-2017. Schlesinger Library, Radcliffe Institute, Harvard University.

1950 births
2015 deaths
American pornographic film actresses
American feminists
American women writers
Women pornographic film directors
Feminist pornography
Sex-positive feminists
Businesspeople from New York City
Pornographic film actors from New York (state)
Deaths from ovarian cancer
Parsons School of Design alumni
City University of New York alumni
Deaths from cancer in New York (state)
High School of Art and Design alumni
20th-century American businesspeople
20th-century American businesswomen
21st-century American women